Cassar is a Maltese surname. 

According to Maltese linguist Mario Cassar, the surname is of Arabic origin, and derives from the Muslim period of Malta. there are also various other proposed origins of the surname.:
 It may be traced back to the Kingdom of the Two Sicilies, incorporating the island of Sicily itself, the area around Naples, and the southern part of the Italian peninsula. The surname Cassar may have derived from the given name "Cesare," and further back from the Roman family name "Caesar." In Classical antiquity, the name "Caesar" was associated by folk etymology with the Latin word "caesaries" (meaning head of hair). The Maltese Cassar coat of arms has the Latin word "SPES" (meaning "hope") inscribed on it.
 It may also derive from a fairly common surname in Italy and Sicily: Cassara, or Cassarino, possibly from a nickname "cassaio" meaning "producer of cases". However these surnames may also be derived from the given name "Cesare" or "Caesar".

The most important representatives of the family are the Cassar Desain, marchese de Sain in Malta and the Cassar Torregiani, one of the richest family in the 19th century in Malta.

References

Bibliography
https://web.archive.org/web/20100521194935/http://www.searchmalta.com/surnames/cassarde-sain/index.shtml
https://web.archive.org/web/20100107034828/http://user.orbit.net.mt/fournier/cassar_torregiani.htm

Surnames
Maltese-language surnames